Lincity is a free and open-source software construction and management simulation game, which puts the player in control of managing a city's socio-economy, similar in concept to SimCity. The player can develop a city by buying appropriate buildings, services and infrastructure. Its name is both a Linux reference and a play on the title of the original city-building game, SimCity, and it was released under the GNU General Public License v2.

Gameplay 

Lincity features complex 2D and top-down gameplay.

The simulation considers population, employment, basic water management and ecology, goods (availability and production), raw materials (ore, steel, coal), services (education, health, fire protection, leisures), energy (electricity and charcoal, coal with finite reserves, solar and wind power) and other constraints such as finance, pollution and transports. The player has to take care of population growth and various socio-economic balances.

Lincity can be won in two ways: reaching sustainable development, or evacuating the entire population with spacecraft. The Lincity homepage has a Hall of Fame, listing players who have succeeded in one of these two goals.

History 
Lincity was created around 1995 as Simcity clone for Linux by I. J. Peters and hosted on SourceForge in 2001. Lincity was originally designed for Linux, but was ported later to Microsoft Windows, BeOS, OS/2, AmigaOS 4, and other operating systems. Mac OS X is supported when compiled from source code using GCC and run using X11.app. It uses SVGALib or X11 as its graphics interface API on Unix systems. As Lincity does software rendering it requires no 3D graphics card and also has very low demands on other computing resources, e.g. much memory or a fast processor. Since 1999 there have been only minor changes to Lincity; the last update was in August 2004.

In 2005 significant development continued with the fork Lincity-NG, which was later transferred to Google Code and then to GitHub. Lincity-NG uses SDL and OpenGL, and features an isometric view, based on Simcity 3000, and graphics which resemble Simcity 3000's.

Critical reception
In 2000, a CNN article on Linux games highlighted Lincity sophistication.
It was The Linux Game Tome Game of The Month for January 2005.
Lincity was 2008 a featured freeware title on 1up.com.
The Washington Post featured Lincity in 2009.

See also 

 List of open source games
 Simutrans
 OpenTTD
 OpenCity
 Micropolis

References

External links 

 Lincity, at SourceForge
 Lincity-NG Source, at GitHub (mirror)
 Lincity-NG downloads (alternate)

1995 video games
AmigaOS 4 games
BeOS games
Open-source video games
City-building games
Fangames
Linux games
OS/2 games
Video game clones
Amiga games
Free software programmed in C
MacOS games
SimCity
Unix games
Video games developed in the United Kingdom
Video games with isometric graphics
Windows games